Pasierb is a surname which means "stepson" in Polish. Notable people with the surname include:

 Janusz Pasierb (1929–1993), Polish Catholic priest and writer

See also
 

Polish-language surnames